Ironstone Vineyards is a winery that is noted for the production of several leading US wine brands, including Obsession Wines, Leaping Horse Vineyards, Christine Andrew, Stone Valley, and Drifting. As of 2004, Ironstone has been listed as the 17th-largest winery (in terms of cases sold) in the United States. Ironstone also sells significant amounts of wine in international markets including the United Kingdom, Canada, and 40 other countries.  Ironstone has used a series of different names and bottle designs including "Kautz Ironstone Vineyards," "Ironstone Vineyards," "IronStone," and, most recently, "Ironstone 4th Generation Family Growers".

Lodi Grape Growers
John and Gail Kautz, founders of Ironstone, were the first to plant chardonnay and other wine varietals in the Lodi area. The Kautz family grows numerous varieties including Cabernet Franc, Symphony, Cabernet Sauvignon, and Merlot. Ironstone Vineyards is a family-run business where apart from the husband-wife duo, John and Gail Kautz, their sons Kurt Kautz is the chief financial officer and Jack Kautz is the director.

The family's Bear Creek Winery, founded in 1934, is listed as having 8.2 million gallons of capacity, making it the 24th largest winery in the U.S. Recent capacity expansions have increased this to an estimated 12 million gallons, making it around the 20th largest winery in the U.S. Jack Kautz, who is also the founder of CrossFit Lodi, is a partner at Bear Creek Winery and is responsible for marketing the family's wines throughout the United States.

In 2015, Jack appealed to Calaveras County Planning Commission to block the construction of the Verizon tower, a mile from the winery. In the same year, Ironstone Vineyards owners, John and Jack Kautz, donated $25,000 to The Murphys Fire Protection Service.

Visitors' center and amphitheater

The Ironstone facility is located in Calaveras County, just outside Murphys, California. The seven-story building is built in the shape of a gold stamp mill.

A 44 lbs troy (16.4 kg) gold specimen, Ironstone's Crown Jewel, the largest specimen of crystalline gold in existence, is on display in the Jewelry Shoppe. 

In March, Ironstone celebrates its Obsession Weekend in which its new Obsession Symphony wine is released in conjunction with a juried art show and other events. Later in March, as Murphys celebrates its Irish Days, Ironstone hosts a multi-county judged daffodil show.

Ironstone puts on annual concerts and in the past has featured acts such as the Russian National Orchestra, Dave Koz, Robert Cray, and Michael McDonald,

In September, Ironstone hosts the Coucours d' Elegance car show  as a fund-raiser for California youth agriculture programs.

See also
 List of contemporary amphithea

References

External links

Ironstone brands
Ironstone Vineyards
Sonoma Creek Wines
Leaping Horse Vineyards
Jack Kautz Blog

Other
Kautz family history
Calaveras Winegrape Alliance

Wineries in California
Companies based in Calaveras County, California
Tourist attractions in Calaveras County, California
1990 establishments in California
American companies established in 1990
Food and drink companies established in 1990